Shigeki Sato may refer to:

, better known as Dick Togo, Japanese professional wrestler
, Japanese politician